Long-Term Evolution (LTE) telecommunications networks use several frequency bands with associated bandwidths.

Frequency bands 
From Tables 5.5-1 "E-UTRA Operating Bands" and 5.6.1-1 "E-UTRA Channel Bandwidth" of the latest published version of the 3GPP TS 36.101, the following table lists the specified frequency bands of LTE and the channel bandwidths each band supports.

Obsolete frequency bands 

These bands were defined by the 3GPP, but have never been deployed commercially, supported by commercial devices or are no longer used.

Deployments by region 

The following table shows the standardized LTE bands and their regional use. The main LTE bands are in bold print.  Not yet deployed are not available (N/A).  Partial deployments varies from country to country and the details are available at List of LTE networks.
 Networks on LTE bands 7, 28 (LTE-FDD) are suitable for global roaming in ITU Regions 1, 2 and 3.
 Networks on LTE bands 1, 3 (LTE-FDD) are suitable for roaming in ITU Regions 1, 3 and partially Region 2 (e.g. Costa Rica, Venezuela, Brazil and some Caribbean countries or territories.
 Networks on LTE band 20 (LTE-FDD) are suitable for roaming in ITU Region 1 only.
 Networks on LTE band 5 (LTE-FDD) are suitable for roaming in ITU Regions 2 and 3. 
 Networks on LTE bands 38, 40 (LTE-TDD) may allow global roaming in the future (ITU Regions 1, 2 and 3).
 Networks on LTE band 8 (LTE-FDD) may allow roaming suitable for roaming in ITU Regions 1, 3 and partially Region 2 (e.g. Peru, El Salvador, Brazil and some Caribbean countries or territories) in the future.
 Networks on LTE bands 2 and 4 (LTE-FDD) are suitable for roaming in ITU Region 2 (Americas) only.

See also 
 LTE
 List of LTE networks
 List of planned LTE networks
 5G NR frequency bands
 UMTS frequency bands

References

External links 
 EARFCN calculator and band reference
 Wireless frequency bands and telecom protocols reference and tools

Bandplans
LTE (telecommunication)